Mintilogli or Midilogli (Greek: Μιντιλόγλι /midi'loɣli/) is a village and a community in the municipal unit of Paralia in the municipality of Patras in Achaea, Greece. It is 1 km south of Paralia, and 8 km southwest of Patras city centre. Ovrya is to the east. The community consists of the villages Mintilogli (seat) and Chantziliako. Its population is around 2,000. Greek National Road 9 (Patras - Pyrgos) passes the village on the north and west.

See also
List of settlements in Achaea

References

Paralia, Achaea
Populated places in Achaea